Allah Dino Sand also spelt as Allahdino Sand (Sindhi: الهڏنو ساند) is a village of Taluka and District Matiari, Sindh, Pakistan. This village is located along Karachi - Peshawer Railway Line. This village has a railway station but currently no train stops here. The Village is connected with Matiari, Tando Jam, Naserpur Town, Shahpur Darpur, Masu Bhurgri and Village Wahid Dino Unar (also called Village Hakeem Pir Hajan Shah Rashidi) via Road. The road from this village to Matiari has been improved in 2017. This Village is located at a distance of about 13 km in the south east of Matiari and 11 km in the north west of Tando Jam. A Primary School, High School, Medical Dispensary and post office have been established here. This Village is named after a noble person of the village. His name was Allah Dino Sand. Sand or Saand (Sindhi: ساند) is a surname of Sindhi Muslim community.

This village is located in a very fertile area of Sindh. Cotton, Wheat, Banana and Sugar Cane are the main crops of this area. 
 

References

Populated places in Matiari District
Villages in Sindh